Donje Dubrave is a village in Karlovac County, Croatia. It is located in the municipality of Ogulin on the old Josephine Road connecting Duga Resa and Senj. The Rijeka-Zagreb railway passes through the village. It has 250 inhabitants, most of them working on the railway in the nearby cities of Ogulin (about 25 km) and Karlovac (about 30 km away). There is an elementary school in the village that was attended by five students until a few years ago. The school is currently closed and the students attend school in Ogulin and Generalski Stol.

History
Donje Dubrave was first mentioned in 1658. It was settled by Orthodox immigrants from Bosnia, which was under 
Ottoman occupation. The people were very loyal to the Austrian Empire. They were predominantly soldiers defending their new land from Ottoman incursions.

Geography 
Donje Dubrave is in the hilly region of western Kordun. A few kilometers to the east is the Mrežnica River, where there is a Croatian nature park with impressive waterfalls.

Demographics
As of 2011, the village had 199 residents. This represents 58.19% of its pre-war population according to the 1991 census.

Notable natives and residents
 Rade Janjanin (1919-1943) - antifascist and People's Hero of Yugoslavia
 Đuro Zatezalo (-2017) - historian and former Director of Karlovac Archives (1965-1992)

See also
Desinec, Croatia
Hreljin

References

Populated places in Karlovac County